Willis is a city in Montgomery County, Texas, United States, located eight miles north of Conroe in north central Montgomery County. The city began to develop in 1870 after what is now the Union Pacific Railroad built track through the area. As a part of the Piney Woods, the Willis economy has historically been driven by lumber, agriculture, and the manufacture of lumber and agriculture equipment. From the late nineteenth to early twentieth century, it produced tobacco as a commodity crop. Competition from Cuba reduced its contribution to the economy.

As of 2020, the population of Willis was estimated to be 6,431. In 2008, after Willis's population passed 5,000, the city established a home rule city charter.

Geography

Willis is located at  (30.422640, –95.478829).

History

Before the founding of Willis, most residents in the area lived in a settlement known as Danville, formed in the 1830s four miles west of present-day New Waverly. A few Danville residents in the 1850s settled to the south, founding the new community of what is now Willis.  

Several of these early Danville residents were large planters, who held numerous enslaved African Americans to work the labor-intensive tobacco crops on their plantations. In the 1850s, enslaved African Americans outnumbered whites in Danville: there were 600 slaves and 400 whites. After the Civil War, many freedmen and their families moved away from the plantations to the Willis area. There in 1867 they established Thomas Chapel United Methodist Church, which is the oldest church in Willis.

In 1870, the Houston and Great Northern Railroad (now the Union Pacific Railroad) decided to build a railroad through Montgomery County. After residents of Danville refused to allow the railway through their town, Peter J. and Richard S. Willis donated a parcel of their landholdings in Montgomery County so the railroad and station stop could be built there. They founded the town of Willis in the process. Upon the railroad's completion in 1872, many residents of Danville, Old Waverly, and Montgomery moved to the new town of Willis.

In 1874, a county election was held to determine whether the county seat of Montgomery County should be transferred from the town of Montgomery to Willis. Although Willis received more votes (788 to 646), it did not gain the requisite two-thirds majority, so the county seat remained officially in Montgomery. A protracted legal battle ended in 1878 when the Supreme Court of Texas ruled in favor of Montgomery. With several county officials and Willis residents refusing to accept the results, another county seat election was held in 1880. That year Montgomery won the vote over Willis, 1308 to 1243. The dispute between the two towns finally ended in 1889, when Conroe was selected as the county seat.

In the 1870s, the main occupations were farming, shipping, and the manufacture of lumber and agricultural products. In 1891, local Willis residents started growing Cuban tobacco, and Willis developed as a center for the production of cigars and other tobacco products. During the early years of the Great Depression, Willis suffered from falling demand in lumber products and a sharp decline in the demand for tobacco products. A man named Tom Payne was lynched in Willis in 1927. 

The economy began to recover in 1931 during the Texas oil boom, when oil was discovered in the area. In the 1930s and 40s, the development of U.S. Route 75, along with the recovery of the lumber industry during World War II, fully revitalized the local economy. 

In the mid to late 20th century through the present, agriculture and lumber remain vital components of the Willis economy, in addition to the retail, service, and manufacturing industries.

Demographics

As of the 2020 United States census, there were 6,431 people, 2,183 households, and 1,688 families residing in the city.

As of the 2010 United States Census, there were 5,662 people, 1,782 households, and 1,340 families residing in the city. The racial makeup of the city was 56.7% White, 18.2% African American, 0.9% Native American, 0.4% Asian, 20.1% from other races, and 3.6% from two or more races. Hispanic or Latino of any race were 38.0% of the population.

There were 1,782 households, out of which 42.5% had children under the age of 18 living with them, 42.5% were married couples living together, 25.0% had a female householder with no husband present, and 24.8% were non-families. 19.6% of all households were made up of individuals. The average household size was 3.10 and the average family size was 3.55.

In the city, the population was spread out, with 33.3% under the age of 18, 11.3% from 18 to 24, 28.4% from 25 to 44, 18.3% from 45 to 64, and 8.1% who were 65 years of age or older. The median age was 29.1 years. For every 100 females, there were 91.4 males. For every 100 females age 18 and over, there were 85.3 males.

According to the 2015 American Community Survey, The median income for a household in the city was $36,640, and the median income for a family was $38,244. Males had a median income of $26,320 versus $18,036 for females. The per capita income for the city was $13,122. About 15.6% of families and 14.4% of the population were below the poverty line, including 16.1% of those under age 18 and 42.6% of those age 65 or over.

Government

Local government
The city was incorporated in 1937. When Willis was incorporated, it was governed by general law, as defined by the Constitution of Texas. In 2008, when population estimates placed noted total residents exceeded 5000 persons, Willis adopted a Home rule city charter. Home Rule in Texas enables cities to establish their own laws as long as those laws are consistent with the Texas Constitution. It also grants greater freedom for cities to levy taxes and pay off debts. On May 10, 2008, the residents of Willis voted to adopt the City of Willis Home Rule Charter.

The city has a council-manager government. The six-member city council consists of a mayor elected at-large and five city council member elected from single-member districts. As of June 2022, the mayor is Leonard Reed. Council members are Ashley Nixon, Barney Stone, Tamara Young-Hector, Thomas Luster, and William Brown. The council appoints a professional city manager to deal with day to day operations and assert substantial administrative powers. As of June 2022, the city manager is Sheyi Ipaye.

State government
Willis is part of District 3, Texas Senate, and represented by Republican Robert Nichols. In the Texas House of Representatives, Willis is part of District 16, represented by Republican Will Metcalf.

Federal government

In the United States Senate, Republicans John Cornyn and Ted Cruz represent the entire state of Texas. In the United States House of Representatives, Willis is part of Texas's 8th congressional district,represented by Republican Kevin Brady.

The United States Postal Service Willis Post Office is located at 609 North Campbell Street.

Infrastructure

Transportation
In the 1960s, Interstate 45 was built through the western portion of Willis, connecting Willis with Houston to the south and Dallas to the north. The previous Houston-Dallas route through Willis, U.S. route 75, is now Texas State Highway 75, running parallel to Interstate 45 through downtown Willis.

Farm to Market Road 1097 connects Willis to Lake Conroe and Montgomery to the west. Its eastern terminus is Texas State Highway 150 to the east of New Waverly.

Union Pacific operates a railroad that travels north-south through Willis.

Parks and recreation
The central portion of Lake Conroe is located a few miles west of Willis.

Sam Houston National Forest is located several miles west, north, and east of Willis.

Education

Primary and secondary schools

Public schools

Willis' public schools are operated by the Willis Independent School District and Responsive Education Solutions.

Five elementary schools, all of which are in Willis, serve portions of Willis:
 Edward B. Cannan Elementary School (Grades Pre-K–5th)
 C. C. Hardy Elementary School (Grades Pre-K–5th)
 Mel Parmley Elementary School (Grades Pre-K–5th)
A.R. Turner Elementary School (Grades Pre-K–5th)
 William Lloyd Meador Elementary School (Grades Pre-K–5th)
 Lagway Elementary School (Grades Pre-K-5th)
 Vista Academy of Willis (Grades K–8)

Two middle schools serve portions of Willis:
 Robert P. Brabham Middle School (Grades 6–8) (Unincorporated Montgomery County)
 Lynn Lucas Middle School (Grades 6–8) (Willis)
 Vista Academy of Willis (Grades K–8)

All of the city is zoned to Willis High School in Unincorporated Montgomery County.

Portions of the city used to be zoned to Turner Elementary School until the attendance zoned changed for the 2006–2007 school year, rezoning the portion to Hardy Elementary School.

Area private schools

 Covenant Christian School

Colleges and universities

Lone Star College (originally the North Harris Montgomery Community College District) serves the community. The territory in Willis ISD joined the community college district in 1996. The nearest campus is Lone Star College-Montgomery, which operates the Conroe Center in northern Conroe.

Public libraries

Montgomery County Memorial Library System operates the R. F. Meador Branch at 709 West Montgomery Street.

Notable people

 Michael Bishop, former professional football player
 Tina Chandler, IFBB professional bodybuilder
 Jessie Hollins (1970–2009), professional baseball player
 Marcus Luttrell, Navy SEAL
 D.D. Terry, professional football player
 Cliff Young (1964–1993), professional baseball player

References

External links
 City of Willis, Texas.
 Willis Independent School District.

Cities in Montgomery County, Texas
Cities in Texas
Greater Houston